Julia Clara Catherine Maria Dolores Robins Norton Birk Olsen Hitchens (December 25, 1907 – August 1, 1973) better known as Dolores Hitchens, was an American mystery novelist who wrote prolifically from 1938 until her death in 1973. She also wrote as D. B. Olsen, a version of her first married name, and under the pseudonyms Dolan Birkley and Noel Burke.

Hitchens collaborated on five railroad mysteries—"police procedurals about a squad of railroad cops"—with her second husband, Bert Hitchens, a railroad detective. She also branched out into other genres including Western fiction. Many of her mystery novels centered on a character named Rachel Murdock.

Hitchens wrote Fool's Gold, the 1958 novel adapted by Jean-Luc Godard for his film Bande à part (1964). Her novel The Watcher was adapted for an episode of the TV series Thriller which aired November 1, 1960.

Biography
Hitchens was born in Texas on December 25, 1907. She was the daughter of W.H. Robbins and Myrtle Statham, who married in Caldwell County, Texas in 1901. In 1910, Dolores (as Julia C. Robbins) and her apparently widowed mother were living with Dolores's paternal grandfather in San Antonio.

Sometime over the next decade, Dolores's mother married a second time, to an unknown Norton, but she was divorced by the time mother and daughter showed up in the 1920 census for Kern County, California.

Myrtle married a third time in 1922, to Oscar ( Arthur) Carl Birk. The Birk family was living in Long Beach by 1930 and Dolores apparently assumed her stepfather's surname.

Hitchens married, in about 1934, Beverley S. Olsen, a radio operator on a merchant vessel, and their 1940 household included the widowed Myrtle Birk.

It is not known whether Dolores divorced Olsen or was widowed, but she apparently married Hubert A. Hitchens by the early 1940s, as they had a child together in 1942. Dolores died in Orange County, California on August 1, 1973, and Hubert died in Riverside County in 1979.

Publications

As Dolores Hitchens

Jim Sader mysteries
 Sleep with Strangers (Doubleday: The Crime Club, 1955); U.K. edition, London: Macdonald, 1956
 Sleep with Slander (Doubleday CC, 1960); UK: London: T.V. Boardman & Co., 1961, American Bloodhound Mystery no. 345
 Simon & Schuster issued trade paperback editions in 1989 (Sleep with Strangers, ; Sleep with Slander).

By Dolores and Bert Hitchens
 F.O.B. Murder (Doubleday CC, 1955); UK: 1957, American Bloodhound no. 154
 One-Way Ticket (Doubleday CC, 1956); UK: 1958, American Bloodhound no. 193
 End of Line (Doubleday CC, 1957); UK: 1958, American Bloodhound. no. 216
 The Man Who Followed Women (Doubleday CC, 1959); UK: 1960, American Bloodhound no. 332
 The Grudge (Doubleday, 1963); UK: 1964, American Bloodhound. no. 466

Standalone books
 Stairway to an Empty Room (Doubleday CC, 1951) 
 Nets to Catch the Wind (Doubleday CC, 1952) — also Widows Won't Wait (NY: Dell Publishing, 1954)
 Terror Lurks in Darkness (Doubleday CC, 1953) 
 Beat Back the Tide (Doubleday CC, 1954); UK: Macdonald, 1955 — abridged as The Fatal Flirt (NY: Joseph W. Ferman, Bestseller mystery no. 184) 
 Fool's Gold (Doubleday CC, 1958); UK: 1958, American Bloodhound no. 234
 The Watcher (Doubleday, 1959); UK: 1959, American Bloodhound. no. 279
 Footsteps in the Night (Doubleday CC, 1961); UK: 1961, American Bloodhound no. 366
 The Abductor (Simon & Schuster, 1962); UK: 1962, American Bloodhound no. 385
 The Bank with the Bamboo Door (Simon & Schuster, 1965); UK: 1965,	American Bloodhound no. 504
 The Man Who Cried All the Way Home (Simon & Schuster, 1966); UK: London: Robert Hale, 1967
 Postscript to Nightmare (G. P. Putnam's Sons, 1967) ; UK title, Cabin of Fear (Michael Joseph, 1968) 
 A Collection of Strangers (Putnam, 1969) ; UK title, Collection of Strangers (Macdonald, 1970)
 The Baxter Letters (Putnam, 1971) ; UK: Hale, 1973
 In a House Unknown (Doubleday CC, 1973) ; UK: Hale, 1974 

Plays
 A Cookie for Henry: one-act play for six women (NY: Samuel French, 1941), as Dolores Birk Hitchens

As D. B. Olsen
Rachel Murdock mysteries
Cat Saw Murder (Doubleday, 1939)
Alarm of Black Cat (Doubleday, 1942)
Catspaw for Murder (Doubleday, 1943); aka Cat's Claw 
The Cat Wears a Noose (Doubleday, 1944)
Cats Don't Smile (Doubleday, 1945)
Cats Don't Need Coffins (Doubleday, 1946)
Cats Have Tall Shadows (Ziff-Davis Publishing Company, 1948)
The Cat Wears a Mask (Doubleday, 1949)
Death Wears Cat's Eyes (Doubleday, 1950)
Cat and Capricorn (Doubleday, 1951)
The Cat Walk (Doubleday, 1953)
Death Walks on Cat Feet (Doubleday, 1956)

Prof. A. Pennyfeather mysteries
Shroud for the Bride (Doubleday, 1945); aka Bring the Bride a Shroud 
Gallows for the Groom (Doubleday, 1947)
Devious Design (Doubleday, 1948)
Something About Midnight (Doubleday, 1950)
Love Me in Death (Doubleday, 1951)
Enrollment Cancelled (Doubleday, 1952); aka Dead Babes in the Wood

Lt. Stephen Mayhew mysteries
 The Clue in the Clay (New York: Phoenix Press, 1938) – her first book published under any name; also NY: Bartholomew House, 1946, A Bart House Mystery no. 35, ASIN B000HU0N64
Death Cuts a Silhouette (Doubleday, 1939)

As Dolan Birkley
Blue Geranium (Bartholomew House, 1944)
The Unloved (Doubleday, 1965)

As Noel Burke
Shivering Bough (E. P. Dutton, 1942)

Notes

References

External links 
 Hitchens bibliographical data at Fantastic Fiction 
 D. B. Olsen at Fantastic Fiction
 
  (1938–1962)
  (1965)
  (cites 1944 publication)

American mystery writers
American women novelists
Writers from San Antonio
20th-century American novelists
1907 births
1973 deaths
Women mystery writers
20th-century American women writers
Novelists from Texas